Peerless may refer to:

Companies and organizations
 Peerless Motor Company, an American automobile manufacturer.
 Peerless Brewing Company, in Birkenhead, UK
 Peerless Group, an insurance and financial services company in India
 Peerless Records, a record company
 Peerless SC, professional football club based in Kolkata, India
 Peerless Volleyball Club, Lima, Peru
 Peerless Faucet, a brand of the Delta Faucet Company
 Agricultural equipment manufactured by Geiser Manufacturing

Places
 Peerless, Indiana, a town in the United States
 Peerless, Utah, a ghost town
 Peerless, Saskatchewan, Canada
 Peerless Building, Fresno

Other
 Peerless Quartet, an American vocal group
 Peerless (UK car), a UK automobile
 Peerless armoured car, developed in 1919
  , a removable hard disk of Iomega brand
 "The Good Ships Peerless", case of mutual mistake in the English law of contract, more formally known as 'Raffles v Wichelhaus'